Bradley James (born 1983 or 1984) is an English actor. He is best known for starring as Arthur Pendragon in the BBC TV (NBC in America) series Merlin, Damien Thorn in Damien, Varga in Underworld: Blood Wars, Giuliano de' Medici in Medici: The Magnificent (2018–2020), and Brigadier General Felix Sparks in The Liberator (2020).

Early life and education
James was born in Exeter, Devon, England. He lived in North Bradley in Wiltshire before his family moved to Jacksonville, Florida, when he was nine. During his time there, he attended Crown Point Elementary and Fletcher Middle School, before returning to England to attend Madeley High School in Madeley, Staffordshire, England. From 2004 to 2007 James attended Drama Centre London, graduating with a Bachelors of Arts degree in acting.

Career

James first appeared in an episode of Lewis in 2008 and also played the part of Ben Davis in the BBC Three comedy-drama film Dis/Connected that same year. Following his performance in Dis/Connected, the producers cast him as Arthur Pendragon, in the BBC One fantasy TV series Merlin. The show was a consistent hit series in the US; its first season was shown on the broadcast network NBC and its second, third, fourth, and fifth seasons on NBC's affiliate cable network Syfy. Merlin ended its 5-year run in 2012. James went on an exploration of Arthurian legends for BBC Wales, The Real Merlin & Arthur, in 2009.

James also guest-starred as Edgar in the fourth season of the Emmy Award-winning political thriller television series Homeland in 2014.

In 2015, James was cast as a villain in Underworld: Blood Wars. The same year, he appeared in the television series iZombie as recurring character Lowell Tracey, a love interest for main character Liv. He starred as title character Damien Thorn on the television series Damien, created by The Walking Dead's Glen Mazzara a sequel to the Omen film series. The show debuted in March 2016.

In 2018, James was cast as Giuliano de' Medici in Medici: The Magnificent alongside Daniel Sharman as Lorenzo de' Medici. The series follows the Medici family, bankers of the Pope, during Renaissance Florence.

In 2020, James played the lead role of American war hero Felix Sparks in The Liberator, Netflix's four-part World War II drama series based on the book by Alex Kershaw. This is the first project produced in Trioscope, a new enhanced hybrid technology that combines state-of-the-art CGI with live-action performance.

James joined second season of Netflix's historical drama Vikings: Valhalla created by Jeb Stuart as a sequel to History's Vikings, filmed in County Wicklow, Ireland. He starred as a local Norwegian farmer and chieftain Harekr which was released on January 12, 2023.

Filmography

Film

Television

References

External links
 
 
 

21st-century English male actors
Actors from Exeter
Alumni of the Drama Centre London
English male television actors
English male voice actors
Living people
Male actors from Devon
1980s births